Ben, Benny or Benjamin Marshall may refer to:

Benjamin Marshall (painter) (1768–1835), English sporting and animal painter
Benjamin Marshall (1874–1944), American architect with Chicago firm Marshall and Fox
Benny Marshall (1919–1969), American sportswriter in Alabama
Ben Marshall (rugby union) (born 1990), Irish loose forward
Ben Marshall (footballer) (born 1991), English winger and right back
Ben Marshall (born 1992), American ice hockey player in 2010–11 USHL season
Ben Marshall, American comedian and comedy writer; member of Please Don't Destroy

Characters
Benjamin Marshall (Shortland Street), played by Graham Puddle on New Zealand soap from 1993 to 2005

See also
Benjamin Marshall House, American 19th-century landmark